Slovenia competed in the Summer Olympic Games for the first time at the 1992 Summer Olympics in Barcelona, Spain.  It was the first Olympiad after Slovenia seceded from Yugoslavia. 35 competitors, 29 men and 6 women, took part in 34 events in 12 sports.

Medalists

Competitors
The following is the list of number of competitors in the Games.

Archery

In Slovenia's first archery competition, the nation entered one archer.  He narrowly missed qualifying for the elimination rounds.
Men

Athletics

Men
Track & road events

Field events

Women
Track & road events

Field events

Canoeing

Slalom

Cycling

One male cyclist represented Slovenia in 1992.

Road

Gymnastics

Artistic
Men

Judo

Men

Rowing

Men

Sailing

Men

Open

Shooting

Men

Swimming

Men

Women

Table tennis

Women

Tennis

Men

Women

References

External links
Official Olympic Reports
International Olympic Committee results database

Nations at the 1992 Summer Olympics
Olympics
1992